Santa Rosa's at-large congressional district is the congressional district of the Philippines in Santa Rosa. It has been represented in the House of Representatives of the Philippines since 2022. Previously included in Laguna's 1st congressional district, it includes all barangays of the city. It is currently represented in the 19th Congress by Danilo Fernandez of the NUP, who has represented the district since its creation.

Representation history

Election results

2022

See also
Legislative district of Santa Rosa

References

Congressional districts of the Philippines
Politics of Laguna (province)
2019 establishments in the Philippines
At-large congressional districts of the Philippines
Congressional districts of Calabarzon
Constituencies established in 2019